Somes Sound is a fjard,
a body of water running deep into Mount Desert Island, the main site of Acadia National Park in Maine, United States. The sound almost splits the island in two.

While often described as the "only fjord on the East Coast", it lacks the extreme vertical relief and anoxic sediments associated with Norwegian fjords, and is now called a fjard by officials — a smaller drowned glacial embayment.

Somes Sound was named for Abraham Somes, who was one of the first settlers on the island and had a home at the end of the sound in Somesville, the first village on the island.

Gallery

References
Notes

Source
 Geology of Acadia National Park

Sounds of Maine
Bodies of water of Hancock County, Maine
Acadia National Park
Fjords of Maine
Fjards